Claire Brosseau is Canadian actor, writer and stand-up comedian.

Filmography

Film

Television

References

External links
 

Canadian television actresses
Canadian film actresses
Canadian stage actresses
Canadian stand-up comedians
1977 births
Living people
Canadian women comedians
Actresses from Montreal
Comedians from Montreal
Neighborhood Playhouse School of the Theatre alumni